"When the Rain Begins to Fall" is a 1984 song written and composed by Peggy March, Michael Bradley, and Steve Wittmack, recorded by singers Jermaine Jackson and Pia Zadora, and released as a US single at the beginning of 1985 (In Europe in October, 1984). The song was performed in the movie Voyage of the Rock Aliens, in which Zadora played a lead role.  Before being released in the US, this track went to number one in several European countries. The song failed to capitalize its European success in America, but did better on the US dance charts (at #22).

Track listing 
12" single
"When the Rain Begins to Fall" (extended version) – 6:07
"Follow My Heartbeat" by Pia Zadora – 4:22
"Escape from the Planet of the Ant Men" (by Jermaine Jackson feat. T. Jackson and R. Jackson) – 5:04
		
7" single
"When the Rain Begins to Fall" – 4:06
"Follow My Heartbeat" (by Pia Zadora) – 4:22

Charts

Certifications

Pappa Bear feat. Van der Toorn version

In 1998, the song was covered by Pappa Bear feat. Van der Toorn.

Track listing

 CD maxi (30 March 1998)
 "When The Rain Begins to Fall" (radio edit) – 3:56
 "Brotherhood" – 4:21
 "Like This" – 3:24

Charts
Weekly charts

Year-end charts

Desperado feat. Pál Tamás cover

In 2007, the song was covered by Hungarian band Desperado featuring singer Tamás Pál.

Track listing
CD maxi (20 February 2007)
 "A csillagokban járunk" (Radio Edit) – 3:56
 "A csillagokban járunk" (Spy the Ghost Mix) – 6:24
 "A csillagokban járunk" (Peat Jr. & Fernando Club Traxx) – 6:03
 "A csillagokban járunk" (Dj Páz Italo Club Mix) – 5:41

Charts

See also
List of Dutch Top 40 number-one singles of 1984
List of number-one hits of 1984 (Germany)
List of number-one hits of 1984 (Switzerland)
List of number-one hits of 1985 (France)

References

1984 singles
1998 singles
2022 singles
Jermaine Jackson songs
Pia Zadora songs
SNEP Top Singles number-one singles
Number-one singles in Germany
Dutch Top 40 number-one singles
Number-one singles in Switzerland
Music videos directed by Bob Giraldi
Songs written for films
1984 songs
Arista Records singles
American new wave songs
American synth-pop songs
Male–female vocal duets
Korean-language songs
Psy songs